Marvel Universe is a 3" action figure line manufactured by Hasbro, featuring characters from the Marvel Comics universe. It first hit stores in early 2009 and features detailed sculpting, multiple points of articulation, and accessories. The line was created by Hasbro Designer Dave Vonner.

Single carded figures – Series 1 (Fury Files) 
The first series of single carded figures are marketed under the name Fury Files, with Nick Fury appearing on the back of the packaging. Each figure comes with a "Top Secret" envelope which includes a Superhuman Registration Act card and official S.H.I.E.L.D. document for each character. The packages also feature character art by Frank Cho. Variants or running changes that share the same numbering as the original figure are noted by an asterisk to the right of a figure followed by "W#", with # being the wave that the variant was released alongside and "R" representing which Revision case of the Wave. All of Series 1 first prints also came with the blue Nick Fury Exclusive Figure Offer sticker that is located at the top right hand corner of the plastic shell.

Wave 1 – March 2009

Wave 2 – March 2009

Wave 3 – April 2009

Wave 4 – May 2009

Wave 5 – September 2009

Single carded figures – Series 2 (H.A.M.M.E.R. Files) 
The second series of single carded figures continued under the Fury Files label, but were based around Marvel's Dark Reign storyline, where Norman Osborn has dissolved S.H.I.E.L.D. and replaced it with H.A.M.M.E.R., his own organization. As such, he replaced Nick Fury on the back of the packaging. Artwork was now done by Mike Deodato. Starting with this series, all single carded figures included figure stands.

Wave 6 – October 2009

Wave 7 – Feb 2010 

The Captain America and Thor variants were surprise repaints that appeared in late 2011, primarily at Family Dollar stores in the United States and as such are informally referred to as "Family Dollar variants".

Wave 8 – April 2010

Wave 9 – June 2010

Wave 10 – September 2010

Wave 11 – October 2010

Single carded figures – Series 3 
The third series of single carded figures debuted in December 2010 and featured character art by Olivier Coipel (Waves 12 and 13), Simone Bianchi (Waves 14 and 15) and Ed McGuinness (Wave 16). Unlike series 1 and 2, it did not include file cards. The theme is once again S.H.I.E.L.D., but with Steve Rogers now in charge and replacing Norman Osborn on the back of the packaging. Series 3 characters also vary depending on what color of S.H.E.I.L.D. emblem they come with. Most are gold colored, others have black or come in both colors. Images of character on packaging card may also be reversed.

Wave 12 – December 2010

World War Hulk, Modular Iron Man and Spider-Man 2099 packed two to a 12-figure case, with one each of Captain Marvel, Doc Samson and Spider-Woman, plus repacks one each of Iron Man, Captain America and Thor from Wave 7.

Wave 13 – April 2011

First Appearance Wolverine, Apocalypse and Gladiator packed two to a 12-figure case, with one each of Cable and Cyclops, plus repacks of one each of World War Hulk, Modular Iron Man, Spider-Man 2099 and Spider-Woman from Wave 12.

Wave 14 – July 2011

Each figure packed two to a 12-figure case, plus repacks of one each of Apocalypse and Gladiator from Wave 13.

Wave 15 – September 2011

Each figure packed two to a 12-figure case, plus repacks of one each of Falcon and Dr. Doom from Wave 14.

Wave 16 – October 2011

Each figure packed two to a 12-figure case, plus repacks of one each of Sub-Mariner and Steve Rogers Captain America from Wave 15.

Single carded figures – Series 4 
The fourth series of single carded figures debuted in December 2011. Character art was by Ed McGuinness (Wave 17 and 18) and Mike Deodato (Wave 19, Wave 20 and Wave 21). Unlike Series 2 and Series 3, it did not include figure stands. There was no theme, with the S.H.I.E.L.D. emblem replaced by comic cover shot artwork specific to each figure. Replacing Steve Rogers on the back of the packaging was a rotation of characters: Deadpool (Wave 17), Rocket Raccoon (Wave 18), M.O.D.O.K. (Wave 19), Sasquatch (Wave 20) and Dazzler (Wave 21). And rather than just one saying across a wave, these characters had different text bubbles for each figure.

Wave 17 – December 2011

Each figure packed two to a 12-figure case, with no repacks from Wave 16 as this wave has an extra sixth figure.

Wave 18 – August 2012

Each figure packed two to a 12-figure case, plus repacks of one each of Green Hulk (Wave 2) and Ghost Rider (Wave 10).

Wave 19 – August 2012

She-Hulk, Punisher and Spider-Man (Future Foundation or Bag Head) packed two to a 12-figure case, with one each of Kang and Scarlet Witch, plus repacks of one each of Spider-Man (Wave 5), Thor (Wave 7), Ghost Rider (Wave 10) and Falcon (Wave 14). This is the first instance of new figures being "short-packed" since Wave 13.

Wave 20 – January 2013

Hercules and Nighthawk packed two to a 12-figure case, with one each of Angel, Nova and Puck, plus repacks of one each of Captain America (Wave 2) and World War Hulk (Wave 12), as well as Ultimate Spider-Man, Hulk and Beast (all Wave 18).

Wave 21 – November 2012
Released in Brazil, Mexico and select Asian markets in August, but not until November in North America.

Each figure packed two to a 12-figure case, plus repacks of Silver Surfer (Wave 1), Psylocke (Wave 17), Hulk (Wave 18), Ultimate Spider-Man (Wave 18), Beta Ray Bill (Wave 18) and Bag Head Spider-Man (Wave 19).

Single carded figures – Series 5 
The fifth series of single carded figures will debut in mid-2013. New character art is by Mike Deodato. Continuing on from Series 4, it did not include figure stands. There was still no theme and it no longer included the comic cover shot artwork specific to each figure that was featured in Series 4. For the first time, the promotional photos on the back of the packaging in some instances featured older figures rather than those new in the current wave.

Wave 22 – July 2013

Each figure packed two to a 12-figure case, plus repacks of Silver Surfer (Wave 1), Black Costume Spider-Man (Wave 3), Iron Spider-Man (Wave 9) and Iron Fist (Wave 17, repainted green). Unlike previous waves, the repacks have been repackaged as Series 5 and inserted into the wave numbering (Silver Surfer 001, Iron Fist 002, Black Costume Spider-Man 007 and Iron Spider-Man 008).

The artwork at the bottom of the back featured Troll.

Wave 23 – September 2013

There are two sets of variants in this wave: A-Bomb and Abomination (packaged as "Marvel's Abominations"); Cloak and Dagger (as "Marvel Knights"). Cloak/Dagger, Iron Man, A-Bomb/Abomination and Baron Zemo are packed two to a 12-figure case, plus repacks of Wolverine (X-Force) (Wave 1), Ghost Rider (Wave 10, repainted black with blue trim), Hulk (Wave 18, repainted grey) and Captain America (Wave 22). Continuing the practice for Series 5, the repacks are repackaged and inserted into the wave numbering.

Wolverine (Astonishing) 009, Thanos 010, Wolverine (X-Force) 011, Dark Hawkeye 012, Red Hulk 013, Spider-Man 014, Punisher 015, Nova 016, Ghost Rider 020, Hulk (Grey) 021.  Running Change:  Colossus 024, Warpath (X-Force) 025.

The artwork at the bottom of the back featured the Watcher.  Repacks featured Cosmo.

Wave 24 – November 2013 – Final Wave

Aurora was announced as a variant (under the name "Alpha Flight") with Northstar (appearing on the back of her packaging), but he was not released until 2015 Wave 3.

Omega Red, Aurora, Nightcrawler and Black Knight are each packed 1 per case.  Repacks consisted of already released figures from the previous waves (no new repacks).

The artwork at the bottom of the back featured Sleepwalker.

Single carded figures – Marvel Infinite Series 
Hasbro announced at San Diego Comic-Con 2013 that the Marvel Universe toyline would end in 2013, replaced by a new line focused on Avengers in 2014 and shifting to X-Men in 2015. It was then clarified that this was just a rebranding exercise and essentially a continuation of the old line. While promoted to retailers as "Avengers Infinite" (with some characters carrying a "Marvel Platinum" billing), the actual packaging refers only to "Marvel Infinite Series". There is no explicit mention of an Avengers focus, but some subtle iconography (Mojnir, Captain America's star, Iron Man's head and Hulk's fist). The shift in focus to X-Men did not occur, with no changes in 2015 to the packaging nor to the character selection.

Inspired by Hasbro's Star Wars: The Black Series the packaging is on a smaller card with a black background and the toyline name followed by the above-mentioned Avengers icons. There is no front character artwork, but the cardback has a picture of the figure and description, along with thumbnails of each of the other figures in the wave. In a further departure, there is no mention of a series number or of any obvious figure numbering. However, Hasbro.com refers to an item number for each figure (listed on the cardboard insert inside the front bubble), which is referred to below for ordering the figures.

Wave 1 (March 2014)

Hulk, Grim Reaper and Hyperion packed two to a 12-figure case, with one Wasp, as well as three of Iron Man and two of Captain America.

Wave 2 (May 2014)

Each figure packed one to a 12-figure case, plus repacks of Grim Reaper, Hyperion, Wasp, Heroic Age Iron Man and Captain America from Infinite Wave 1.

Wave 3 (June 2014)

Each figure packed two to a 12-figure case.

Wave 4 (July 2014)

Each figure packed two to a 12-figure case, plus repacks of two each of Hulk (Infinite Wave 1) and Death's Head (Infinite Wave 2).

Wave 1 2015 – January 2015

Big Time Spider-Man, Classic Sandman and Blue Beast packed two to a 12-figure case, with one of each other figure.

Wave 2 2015 – April 2015

Each figure packed two to a 12-figure case.

Colossus (as Juggernaut) (from cancelled Astonishing X-Men set) and Northstar (unreleased from Wave 24) both appear as promoted figures on some of the back packaging to this wave, but were not released until the next wave.

Wave 3 September 2015

Each figure packed two to a 12-figure case.

Scarlet Spider (Kaine version) and Ultron (gold repaint) appear as promoted figures on some of the back packaging of this wave. However, neither were released as Colossus (as Juggernaut) and Northstar were moved into this wave from the previous one. Hasbro announced at SDCC 2015 that Scarlet Spider would be part of a comic pack.

Single carded figures – Marvel Legends Series 
At New York Comic Con 2015, Hasbro revealed new carded figures rebranded under the Marvel Legends Series moniker, which had been suggested at on its presentation slides at SDCC 2015. As part of the rebranding, the package art featured the return of character art on the card front, which had been lost under the Infinite Series. The main change on the card back was to feature all the figures in the wave (including the figure on that card). Previously, the Infinite Series had teased just three other figures from that wave, with the assortment varying from figure to figure.

Wave 1 2016 – February 2016
These figures were revealed by Hasbro at SDCC 2015 on a single presentation slide, which was then confirmed to be a wave with carded figures shown at NYCC 2015.

Each figure packed one to an 8-figure case.

Wave 2 2016 – March 2016
The new figures in this wave were revealed by Hasbro at its Marvel Panel at SDCC 2015.

Each figure packed one to an 8-figure case, except for Vision that is packed two to a case.

Wave 3 2016 – May 2016
Hydro-Man, Quasar, Rogue and Morbius were revealed by Hasbro on its Pulse webpage in December 2015 (and confirmed as being in Wave 3), with the figures first shown at New York Toy Fair 2016 in February 2016.

Each figure packed one to an 8-figure case, along with repacks of Iron Man, Spider-Man, Black Panther (all Wave 1 2016) and Armored Spider-Man (Wave 2 2016).

Wave 1 2017 – December 2016

Wolverine and Invincible Iron Man packed two to an eight-figure case, with one of each other figure.

Wave 2 – October 2017

Case proportions not yet know, includes repacks of Captain Marvel and Spider-Man Noir (both Wave 1 2016).

The Joaquin Torres version of Falcon (from the 2015 All-New, All-Different Marvel publication push) was pictured on the back of card cross sell, but never released.

Comic Packs – Series 1 (Secret Wars: 25th Anniversary) 
Each two-pack includes a reprint from Marvel's Secret Wars comic series and features original art from Bob Layton on the packaging.

Wave 1 – August 2009

Wave 2 – September 2009

Wave 3 – Early 2010

Wave 4 – March 2010

Comic Packs – Series 2 (Marvel's Greatest Battles) 
The second series of Comic Packs are focused on famous battles that occurred in single issues.

Wave 5 – August 2010

Wave 6 – August 2010

Wave 7 – March 2011

Wave 8 – Summer 2011

Wave 9 – September 2011

Wave 10 – November 2011

Wave 11 – December 2011

Wave 12 – July 2012
Toys R Us Exclusive

Wave 13 – July 2012

Wave 14 – November 2012

Cancelled
The Secret Avengers comic pack was shown at conventions and was even advertised on Hasbro.com, but never made it to retail though a few of them sold on eBay.

Comic Packs – Marvel Legends Series 
At SDCC 2015, Hasbro announced the return of comic packs with two waves revealed.

Wave 1 – February 2016

Wave 2 – July 2016 

Scarlet Spider (Kaine version) was originally intended to be a single-card release and appears on some card backs for Marvel Infinite Series Wave 3 2015.

Wave 3 – August 2016 
A comic pack with comic versions of Ronan the Accuser and Korath was listed here but never released. The Ronan would have had a Universal Weapon accessory, and Korath would have had beta-batons.

Marvel GamerVerse Packs 
While Hasbro seems mainly to have discontinued the G.I. Joe style for Marvel characters with great articulation in the 3" scale, they have released 2 packs featuring sculpts and molds from the Marvel Universe and other complimentary lines in 2017 and 2018. Each pack is based on a video game featuring Marvel characters.

Wave 1 – 2017

Wave 2 – 2018

Team Packs

2011

2012

2013

2017

2018

Cancelled
Hasbro revealed at conventions prototypes of these team sets to be sold in the second half of 2013. However, they were cancelled with an indication that efforts would be made to reintroduce these figures in the rebranded Marvel Infinite toyline.

Gigantic Battles

Wave 1 – October 2009 
This Walmart-exclusive wave includes a regular 3" scale figure with a larger 12" figure. Each one will be packaged with a comic book, showing the inspiration for the set. An asterisk to the right of the comic title denotes a variant figure or running change in the set.

Wave 2 – April 2011

Masterworks 
This special line consists of super-sized 19" figures packaged with a regular 3" figure. The giant figures will all include lights and sounds.

Wave 1 – October 2010 
This wave has been released. The packaging, with artwork by Mike Deodato, is designed to lie on its side due to the large nature of the product. It will include a flip-open top so consumers can see the figure inside. Hasbro brand manager Scott George provides the voice of Galactus.

Wave 2 – Fall 2011

Wave 3 – Cancelled 
Hasbro revealed at San Diego Comic-Con 2011 a finished prototype of Fin Fang Foom (orange version) for sale in 2012, but it was never released and in 2013 was finally confirmed as cancelled. It was stated by David Vonner that the packaging would prominently feature Howard the Duck with Fin Fang Foom advertised as the pack-in figure, as a humorous reversal of the typical arrangement of the top billing going to the large figure and the smaller being considered a pack-in.

Exclusives

Marvel Digital Comics Unlimited Mail-Aways 
To receive these figures, one would have to subscribe to Marvel Digital Comics Unlimited website. The character offered seems to change each year, with Nick Fury in 2009 and Archangel in 2010. New York Comic Con 2010 attendees could purchase Archangel as an incentive for subscribing at the convention. In February 2011, Marvel.com offered Archangel to NEW subscribers only.

San Diego Comic-Con
The following are all single-carded figures with their own special numbering and artwork by Joe Quesada. SD1 through SD4 are packaged together as part of The Invaders Box Set, while the black and white Captain America is sold separately from the set.

Battle Three-Packs – August 2009 
This line consists of themed three-packs and are sold exclusively at Toys "R" Us. Hasbro mislabeled the Soldiers and Henchmen'''s Chaste Ninja as a "white" Hand Ninja.

 Battle Two-Packs – July 2010 
These two-packs are exclusive to Target and feature repaints and new bodies for previously released characters. Like the Soldiers and Henchmen'' 3-Pack's "white" Hand Ninja, Hasbro misrepresents The Hand once again with a new "black" Hand Ninja. In this version, the "black" Hand Ninja is a single individual who has trained extensively to combat exclusively with Wolverine.

35th Anniversary Giant Size X-Men Box-set 
This set is a Toys R Us and Disney Store exclusive.

New York Comic Con 2011

Ultimate Gift Set 
This five pack was available through Wal-Mart in the winter of 2011 and featured repaints of previously released figures.

Avengers Light-Up Base Figures 
This series is an exclusive to Toys "R" Us. Each figure comes with a light-up base that connects to the bases of the rest of the series to form a S.H.I.E.L.D. platform.

Wave 1 – October 2011

Wave 2 – April 2012

Avengers Super Helicarrier 
The Comic Con version is marketed under the "Marvel Universe" line while the Toys R Us version is marketed under the "Avengers" line.

X-Factor Gift Set 
Released first at San Diego Comic-Con 2012, then Toys R US.

New York Comic Con 2012 
Was only made available to a very limited number of people invited to a Hasbro event on the eve of the convention.

See also 
 Spider-Man (2010 toy line), a 3" Marvel toyline from Hasbro in 2010, with some compatible figures.
 Captain America: The First Avenger (toy line), a compatible, 3" Marvel movie toyline from Hasbro in 2011.
 Thor: The Mighty Avenger (toy line), a compatible, 3" Marvel movie toyline from Hasbro in 2011.
 DC Universe Infinite Heroes, a similar 3" toyline for DC Comics characters, but with less articulation and slightly smaller.
 Marvel Legends, a 6" scale Marvel toyline from Hasbro, similar in design with some figures upscaled from the 3" toylines.

References

External links 
 Marvel Universe Visual Checklist & Review Index
  Complete Marvel Universe Collectors Checklist & Collection Management
 1:18 Scale Marvel Universe action figure checklist

Hasbro products
2000s toys
Marvel Comics action figure lines
Keshi